Major Raymond "Rattlesnake James" Lisenba (March 6, 1894 – May 1, 1942) also known as Robert S. James, was the last man to be executed by hanging in California. He was charged with murdering his fifth wife, Mary Busch, to collect her life insurance benefit and was also suspected of causing the deaths of his third wife, Winona Wallace, and nephew, Cornelius Wright, to collect their life insurance benefits.

Biography
A native of Hale County, Alabama, Lisenba first worked in the cotton fields and then was sent to barber school by his sister's husband. In 1921, he married Maud Duncan, but she soon filed for divorce, accusing him of "kinky" and "sadistic" sex. Lisenba moved to Kansas and remarried, but his second wife divorced him after the father of a pregnant young woman ran him out of town. He moved to North Dakota and changed his surname to "James."

First wife
Major Lisenba married his first wife, Maud Duncan, on 8 Oct 1914 in Birmingham, Jefferson, Alabama On 5 Jun 1917, he reports as married, with "wife, baby, mother dependents" for his U.S., World War I Draft Registration.

Name change
It appears that Major Lisenba changed his name between 1917 and 1925 to Robert S. James.

Second wife
In the 1925 Kansas State Census, "R.S. James" (family 920) appears with wife Vera May James. and as "Robert S. James" (family 133) with wife Vera May James, mother-in-law Maud Vermillion, and brother-in-law Wayne Vermillion in Emporia, Lyon, Kansas, United States.

Death of third wife
After he was the sole beneficiary of an uncle's $4,000 life insurance policy, James got the idea of committing fraud. In 1932, he opened a barber shop in La Cañada Flintridge, California and married his third wife, Winona Wallace, and set a pair of $5,000 insurance policies for both from Prudential Insurance.

On September 21, the couple was driving on Pikes Peak Highway near Glen Cove, Colorado, with Wallace at the wheel when the car left the road and fell down a mountainside. James told investigators he managed to jump free, but Wallace remained trapped in the vehicle until it stopped against a large boulder about 150 feet below the road. When rescuers got to the scene, they found Wallace alive with relatively minor injuries despite the intensity of the crash. She also smelled of liquor and had a massive wound behind her ear. A coroner later (1935?) removed bullet fragments from her brain. Wallace was released from the hospital on October 8 and recovering at a cottage in Manitou Springs when about a week later, James and a grocer found her lying on her back in a half-filled tub. At the coroner's inquest, medical examiner George B. Gilmore testified that James told him his wife had ignored physician's orders to avoid washing her hair because of the head wound and drowned as a result.

Prudential eventually paid off on Wallace's policy. Following the death of Busch, an autopsy was made on Wallace and the medical examiner testified that she suffered two skull fractures caused by a hard, moving object projected against in it.

Fourth wife
Robert James reported his fourth wife was Ruth Thomas but said he wasn't sure about their marriage because he was drunk. He reported the marriage annulled in New Orleans in 1934.

Death of nephew
James took out an insurance policy on his nephew Cornelius Wright, a young sailor. James invited Wright to visit him while he was on leave. During the subsequent visit, James allowed his nephew to use his car. Wright thereafter died when he purportedly drove the car off a cliff. The mechanic who towed the wreck back to James told him that something was wrong with the steering wheel.

Death of fifth wife
In March 1935, Ray James met Mary Emma Busch, who would become his fifth wife. In June 1935, Ray asked Charles Hope, one of his loyal customers who was struggling financially, to help him kill Mary for her $5000 life insurance, offering $100 plus expenses for two rattlesnakes, which he planned to use to poison Mary.

Hope brought the snakes to the James' house on August 4 to find Mary Emma, who was pregnant at the time, strapped to the kitchen table with her eyes and mouth taped shut. James said that he managed to get his wife on the table by telling her a doctor was coming to "perform some kind of operation on her for pregnancy." Hope watched as Ray put Mary Emma's foot in the box with the two snakes, which bit her, then left the house to return and pick up his wife.

Returning to the house at 1:30 a.m. Hope found that Mary was still alive. Drunk and outraged, Ray took her to the bathtub, drowned her, and put her body by the fish pond in their backyard in an attempt to make it look like an accident. Hope left, having refused James's order to burn down the house.

Mary's death was ruled a drowning until a drunken Hope bragged at a bar about his involvement in her murder. The bartender reported this to police and Hope was arrested. Under intense questioning, Hope explained the plot thoroughly and James was arrested in 1936. A snake bite on Mary's toe overlooked during the autopsy confirmed this. Both were found guilty of their crimes, with James receiving the death penalty and Hope life in prison.

On May 1, 1942, Rattlesnake James was executed by hanging at San Quentin State Prison in California. The rope was the wrong length and it took over ten minutes for Rattlesnake James to die.

See also
 Capital punishment in California
 Capital punishment in the United States
 Lisenba v. People of State of California

References

External links
 People v. Lisenba (1939) 14 Cal 2d 403 
 Lisenba v. People of State of California (1941) 
Prairie Public Television biography
Brenner, Anita La Cañada's First U.S. Supreme Court Case
Brenner, Anita Warden Hears James' Death Rattle
Duffy, Clinton Eighty Eight Men and Two Women (1988) 
Nash, Jay  Bloodletters and Badmen(1995) 

1894 births
1942 deaths
20th-century executions by California
20th-century executions of American people
American people executed for murder
Murderers for life insurance money
People convicted of murder by California
People executed by California by hanging
People from Hale County, Alabama
People from La Cañada Flintridge, California
Suspected serial killers
Uxoricides